Bagh-e Olya may refer to:

 Bagh-e Olya, Lorestan
 Bagh-e Olya, West Azerbaijan